Whut? Thee Album is the debut studio album by American rapper Redman; it was released on September  22, 1992 by Rush Associated Labels and Chaos Recordings, distributed by Columbia Records. Taking place at Ian London Studios, North Shore Soundworks and Power Play Studios, recording sessions began in 1991 and continued into 1992. The album features production from mentor and fellow Hit Squad member Erick Sermon, as well as Redman himself under his birth name Reggie Noble, with additional production from Pete Rock.

Upon its release, Whut? Thee Album debuted at number 59 on the US Billboard 200, and peaked at number 49 the following week. In June 1993, the album was certified Gold by the Recording Industry Association of America (RIAA), exceeding the sales of 500,000 copies in the United States. The album initially garnered favorable reviews from music critics due to Redman's humorous lyrics, and the album's production, which was noted as having the "EPMD sound." Over the years, Whut? has been described as a classic hip hop album, among Redman's best work.

Background 
Reggie "Redman" Noble spent the majority of his youth selling drugs, and DJing at clubs and parties. At the age of 16, he began rapping, being heavily influenced by the comedy raps of Biz Markie. Although, he would eventually become a close affiliate of the hip hop duo EPMD, it wasn't until 1990, where Redman first met them, while DJing for DoItAll (of Lords of the Underground) at a club where MC Lyte was headlining. The two parties eventually met backstage where a freestyle cipher was taking place, with EPMD member Erick Sermon being so impressed with Redman's raps that he invited him to perform during the duo's set. Before long, EPMD quickly embraced Redman as a Hit Squad member, while they brought him on tour to freestyle and DJ at their shows. In addition, EPMD gave Redman two guest spots for the songs "Hardcore" and "Brothers on My Jock", off their third album Business as Usual (1990), which helped him gain exposure in the hip hop underground. One year later, Redman was signed to Def Jam, where he began writing and recording what would eventually become Whut? Thee Album.

According to Erick Sermon, Q-Tip from the group A Tribe Called Quest was instrumental in Redman's obtaining a record deal. Q-Tip had been in the Rush Management offices, and after hearing Redman's song "Jam 4 U", tried to persuade Lyor Cohen and Big D ([Lyor's tour manager]) to give Redman a deal. Initially, Sermon stated that Cohen wasn't too interested in the material, stating "We had "Hardcore", the teaser, and then when an early bootleg of "Head Banger" came out, they were like, 'we made the right choice.'"

Recording for the album began in 1991, and continued into 1992, while taking place at Ian London Studios, North Shore Soundworks, and Power Play Studios. During this time, Redman did another collaboration with EPMD on their fourth album Business Never Personal (1992). As EPMD member Parish Smith was often credited for mentoring Hit Squad artists Das EFX and K-Solo, Erick Sermon helped mentor Redman throughout the album, while receiving co-production credits for most of the album's songs. In spite of this, Redman was still left alone throughout the majority of the writing and recording process. He later recollected "For that whole album I was under a lot of pressure to learn, and learn quickly. Erick showed me a couple of recording moves, then threw me in the studio and just left me there. I had to learn and do it myself. Erick was always there if I really needed him, so it wasn't that bad. But he had his own shit to deal with and he figured I was okay on my own." Redman further stated "When I first started doing the album I was mad at Erick for leaving me in the studio. I was like 'what the fuck am I doing here?' I had an album to hit the world with, and it was just up to me. But I'm glad he did it, because I learned everything that I needed to."

Critical reception 

Whut? Thee Album received favorable reviews from music critics upon its release. Entertainment Weekly'''s James Bernard gave the album an A− rating, and called it "engaging, hilarious, bargain-basement funk that doesn't care what you think". In its November 1992 issue, The Source magazine rated it 4½ out of 5 "mics", with writer Matty C declaring the album as living up to the expectations it accumulated in the previous year. Although he was un-favorable of its skits, he praised the album's "funky" production, and Redman's charismatic lyrics and flow, stating "...not only has he mastered the laid back, homicidal flow, but he can also have you picking yourself up from the floor from his hysterical punchlines". In his review for The Washington Post, Gil Griffin wrote "EPMD produced this album and give it their trademark, thick hard funky stamp, while Redman kicks it with his deep, convincing voice, likening himself to a psycho, a lover and a fighter. The booming drums come in extra handy on "Blow Your Mind," "Time 4 Sum Aksion" and "So Ruff," where he flows with free-style rhymes".

Commercial performanceWhut? Thee Album debuted at 49 on the US Billboard 200 chart and peaked at number five on the US Top R&B/Hip-Hop Albums chart. In June 1993, the album was certified gold by the Recording Industry Association of America (RIAA) for sales of over 500,000 copies in the United States. As of October 2009, the album has 654,800 copies in the United States.

 Legacy 
Since its release, Whut? Thee Album has risen in stature, and has been regarded as a hip hop classic from several music critics and writers. In 1998, it was included in the Source magazine's 100 Best Rap Albums list. In 2000, Melody Maker gave the album 4½ out of 5 stars, while calling it a "landmark hip-hop album". Allmusic's Steve Huey gave the album 4½ out of 5 stars, stating "Whut? Thee Album is a terrific debut that established Redman as one of the top MCs on the East Coast. His aggressive delivery is more than hardcore enough for the streets, but Whut? is first and foremost a party record ... He's able to carry it all off with a singular sense of style, thanks to a wild sense of humor that results in some outlandish boasts, surreal threats, and hilarious left-field jokes." In 2008, Henry Adaso from About.com ranked Whut? Thee Album number five on his Best Rap Albums of 1992 list, and number 32 on his 100 Greatest Hip-Hop Albums list.

 Track listing 

 Personnel 
Information adapted from album liner notes.

 Reggie "Redman" Noble – performer, producer
 Erick Sermon – producer, performer
 Parish Smith – producer
 Pete Rock – producer
 Mr. Bozack – producer
 Hurricane G – performer
 DJ Scratch – scratches (track 5)

 Charlie Marotta – recorder
 Ken Wallace – recorder
 Ivan Rodriguez – recorder, mixing
 Everett Ramos – assistant recorder
 Rod Cee – assistant mixing
 The Drawing Board – art direction, design
 Timothy Carter – photography

Charts

Weekly charts

 Singles 

Certifications

 Notes 

 References 

 External links 
 
 Whut? Thee Album'' at Discogs

1992 debut albums
Albums produced by Erick Sermon
Albums produced by Pete Rock
Def Jam Recordings albums
Columbia Records albums
Redman (rapper) albums